Weikerlsee is a pair of recreational lakes just south of the confluence of the Traun and the Danube in the urban district of Ebelsberg. It includes the bathing lake, a green belt, some parking spaces, toilets, a snack bar and a nudist area on the north bank of the smaller of the two lakes. A canal joins the smaller and the larger lakes. To the south of the Larger Weiklsee are the rainwater drainage basins for the Linz sewage network.

Recreational use

The larger lake is  lower than the smaller lake.

The smaller lake was enlarged at the beginning of the 21st century. A bridge with a viewing platform separates the northern nudist area from the southern textile beach. On the south bank is a snack bar with toilets.
Bathing is strictly forbidden in the larger lake  because it is a nature reserve. Both lakes have a low water temperature due to the groundwater sources.

Lakes of Upper Austria